The 1995 Indiana Hoosiers football team represented Indiana University Bloomington as a member of the Big Ten Conference during the 1995 NCAA Division I-A football season. Led by 12th-year head coach Bill Mallory, the Hoosiers compiled an overall record of 2–9 with a mark of 0–8 in conference play, placing last out of 11 teams in the Big Ten. The team played home games at Memorial Stadium in Bloomington, Indiana.

Schedule

Game summaries

Western Michigan

Kentucky

Southern Miss

Northwestern

Illinois

Iowa

Michigan

Penn State

Michigan State

Ohio State

Purdue

1996 NFL draftees

References

Indiana
Indiana Hoosiers football seasons
Indiana Hoosiers football